"What'll I Do" is a song written by Irving Berlin in 1923. It was introduced by singers Grace Moore and John Steel late in the run of Berlin's third Music Box Revue and was also included in the following year's edition.

Background
"What'll I Do" is one of the few songs by Berlin that is clearly autobiographical.  His fiancée, a society beauty named Ellin MacKay, had been sent to Europe by her disapproving father, a very wealthy Long Island magnate, in the hopes that MacKay would forget Berlin.  (She did not and eventually they married.)  The song was written during McKay's "tour" of Europe.  In the lyrics, the singer longs disconsolately for his love, imagining how he can go on without her.

Recordings
Nat King Cole recorded a cover for his album Unforgettable (1952).
Julie London recorded her version of this song in 1955, released in 1956 on her album ‘’Lonely Girl’’.
Johnny Mathis included on his Warm album (1957).
Frank Sinatra recorded a well-known cover for his album All Alone (1962).
Johnny Tillotson released his version on an LP, EP and B-side in 1962.
The Fleetwoods released a cover as a single in 1963.
Cher released a cover as a part of her 1974 album Dark Lady.
Nancy Sinatra released it on the album ‘’Sugar’’ in 1967.
Harry Nilsson included this song on his 1973 album of American standards, A Little Touch of Schmilsson in the Night, arranged by Gordon Jenkins.
Linda Ronstadt and the Nelson Riddle Orchestra covered the song on her album What's New, produced by Peter Asher in 1983, with tenor sax solo by Bob Cooper. 
Rosemary Clooney released a cover in 1984 on her album ‘’Rosemary Clooney Sings the Music of Irving Berlin’’.
Elkie Brooks recorded a cover for her album Screen Gems (1984).
Pink Martini included it in their album Get Happy (2013).
Bob Dylan covered it in his album Shadows in the Night (2015).
The song was included on Seth MacFarlane’s fifth album, Once in a While.

In popular culture
The song was used as a generalized theme in Nelson Riddle's Academy Award-winning period score for the film The Great Gatsby (1974) starring Robert Redford and Mia Farrow, sung by character actor William Atherton. 
It was sung by Mary Steenburgen in the movie The Butcher's Wife (1991)
Bea Arthur sang it in The Golden Girls episode, "Journey to the Center of Attention".
The song was used as the theme tune to the British sitcom Birds of a Feather, performed by William Atherton and later its lead stars Pauline Quirke and Linda Robson. 
An instrumental version of the song was used under the closing scene of "I Do, Adieu" (1987), the fifth-season finale of the sitcom Cheers.  
The Johnny Mathis version of the song was also used in the closing scene of "The Jet Set," the eleventh episode in the second season of Mad Men.
Adam Hurrey performed a version of the song in the style of football supporters as part of the "Football Cliches" podcast in May 2022.

Notes

External links
 

Songs written by Irving Berlin
1923 songs
Pat Boone songs
Cher songs
Rosemary Clooney songs
Nat King Cole songs
Perry Como songs
The Fleetwoods songs
Judy Garland songs
Johnny Mathis songs
Rufus Wainwright songs
Anne Murray songs
Harry Nilsson songs
Linda Ronstadt songs
Frank Sinatra songs
Liza Minnelli songs
Songs about heartache
Songs about loneliness